Abram, or Ab Salm (29 October 1801, Amsterdam - 4 December 1876, Amsterdam) was a Dutch painter.

Biography
He was born in Amsterdam and became a member of the Koninklijke Academie in 1833. He is known for landscapes. He spent 29 years in Indonesia and his views of Java were engraved by Johan Conrad Greive and published in Amsterdam in 1872.

He died in Amsterdam.

References

External links

Ab Salm on Artnet

1801 births
1876 deaths
Dutch male painters
Painters from Amsterdam
19th-century Dutch painters
19th-century Dutch male artists